Lake Davos is a small natural lake at Davos, Switzerland. Its surface area is 0.59 km² and the maximum depth is 54 m. Fed by sources of the Rhine, Flüelabach and Totalpbach, among other mountain creeks, the lake is used as a hydropower reservoir; its water no longer flows to the river Landwasser but is channeled into the river Landquart at Klosters.

See also
List of lakes of Switzerland
List of mountain lakes of Switzerland

External links
Verordnung über die Fischerei am Davosersee   fishing regulations

Davos
Davos
Davos
LDavos